Xinjiekou  is a subdistrict of Xicheng District (西城区) of Beijing, China. As of 2020, the subdistrict has a total population of 84,866.

The subdistrict got its name from a section of road on the eastern portion of Xizhimennei Avenue, which used to be a river port but underwent land reclamation in 1438. The newly created land was settled, and recorded as Xinjiekou in 1593.

History

Administrative Division 
By 2021, It is divided into the following village-level divisions:

Landmarks 

 Miaoying Temple
 Guangji Temple
 Beijing Lu Xun Museum
 Guanghua Temple

See also
Xinjiekou (Nanjing)

References

External links 
 Official Website (Archived)

Streets in Beijing
Xicheng District
Subdistricts of Beijing